Charles E. Gunn (July 31, 1883 – December 6, 1918) was an American silent film actor with the Vitagraph Company of America. 

Gunn was born in Wisconsin but was educated in San Francisco after his family moved to California.

After debuting in a bit part in a play in San Francisco, Gunn acted on stage with the Harry Davis, Morosco, and Alcazar stock theater troupes, and was the leading man for theatrical companies in Cincinnati, Minneapolis, and Pittsburgh. He also toured in productions of St. Elmo and The Conspiracy.

On December 6, 1918, Gunn died in Los Angeles in the Spanish flu pandemic.

Selected filmography
Sherlock Holmes Solves the Sign of the Four (1913) *short
The Best Man's Bride (1916) *short
 The Eagle's Wings (1916)
 Blood Will Tell (1917)
 Sweetheart of the Doomed (1917)
 The Snarl (1917)
Happiness (1917)
 Love or Justice (1917)
Madcap Madge (1917)
Chicken Casey (1917)
An Even Break (1917)
Mountain Dew (1917)
A Phantom Husband (1917)
The Firefly of Tough Luck (1917)
Framing Framers (1917)
Betty Takes a Hand (1918)
Captain of His Soul (1918)
Unfaithful (1918)*short
Patriotism (1918)
Wedlock (1918)
The White Lie (1918)
The Flame of the West (1918)*short
The Midnight Stage (1919)
It Happened in Paris (1919)

References

External links

 Charles Gunn at IMDb.com

1883 births
1918 deaths
Deaths from the Spanish flu pandemic in California
Male actors from Wisconsin
20th-century American male actors
American male film actors
American male stage actors